Ronipara is a village in Ruma Upazila of Bandarban District in the Chittagong Division of southeastern Bangladesh. Its geographical location is: N22.16878° and E92.44309°.

References

Populated places in Bandarban District